Joshua Neil Farro (born September 29, 1987) is an American musician, best known as the former lead guitarist and backing vocalist for the rock band Paramore. He has most recently pursued a solo career as the lead vocalist and guitarist of his self-named band Farro. His debut solo album, Walkways, was released in 2016.

Early life
Farro was born in Voorhees Township, New Jersey, on September 29, 1987, the second-oldest of five siblings, including Paramore drummer Zac Farro. He is a self-taught guitarist and began playing when he was 13 years old. His family later moved to Franklin, Tennessee.

Career

Paramore (2004–2010)
Along with his younger brother Zac, Farro was a founding member of Paramore, serving as the band's lead guitarist and backing vocalist from 2004 until his exit in late 2010. Farro also co-wrote almost every track on Paramore's first three albums with Hayley Williams and occasionally Taylor York.

Departure and blog controversy
On December 21, 2010, a blog appeared online claiming to be an official exit statement from the Farro brothers. The blog entry refuted statements made by Paramore's official website regarding the brothers' departure and was heavily critical of Hayley Williams, her family, Atlantic Records, and Fueled by Ramen. Farro appeared in a video on YouTube claiming that the blog was genuine. The video was quickly removed for reported violations, but Farro re-uploaded it a few days later. Farro, a Christian, cited his and Williams' differing beliefs as a reason for departing Paramore.

Novel American (2011–2014)

On February 2, 2011, Farro announced he had established a Twitter account for his new band, Novel American. The band included high school friends Van Beasley, Tyler Ward, and Ryan Clark, each formerly of the band Cecil Adora. Unlike in Paramore, Farro relegated himself to guitar in the new project, saying, "I never wanted to sing. My voice — and this is not false humility — is just not that good."

On February 22, 2011, the band announced Farro's brother Zac would replace Tyler Ward on drums. However, on May 23, 2014, Farro stated that he had scrapped the project entirely, primarily due to the lack of a suitable vocalist.

Farro (2014–2017)
In May 2014, Farro announced on Twitter that he had scrapped his previous band, Novel American, because "nothing was going anywhere". Later that year, he announced the name of his solo project, Farro. His debut single, "Color Rush", was released in November 2014, with a music video appearing on YouTube. Farro released his debut album, Walkways, independently on February 5, 2016. 

He announced a mini tour to support the album throughout the year. On May 19, 2017, he announced on Twitter that he is writing for his second album, however there has been no update on a release date since.

Personal life
Farro previously dated Paramore singer and bandmate Hayley Williams from 2004 to 2007, and later dated Tabitha Richards in 2009.

On April 3, 2010, Farro married fiancée Jenna Rice in Tennessee, missing Paramore's Pacific Rim tour to plan the nuptials. Their daughter was born on January 28, 2018, and their son was born on May 22, 2020.

He has four siblings: Nate, Zac, Jonathan, and Isabelle. Farro currently resides in Nashville, Tennessee.

Other songs
He was one of three co-writers of the song "This Is Amazing Grace" along with Jeremy Riddle and Phil Wickham; the song is featured on both Bethel Music's (Bethel Church) live CD/DVD For the Sake of the World where Jeremy performed it, as well as on Phil Wickham's album The Ascension.

References

External links

Bio at Paramore.net

1987 births
Living people
American people of Italian descent
American rock guitarists
American male guitarists
Lead guitarists
Singers from New Jersey
Paramore members
People from Voorhees Township, New Jersey
American male singers
Guitarists from New Jersey
21st-century American singers
American Christians